The American Library Association, founded in 1876 and chartered in 1879, is the largest professional organization for librarians in the United States. The headquarters of the American Library Association is in Chicago, Illinois.

Table of ALA presidents

References

External links
Ala.org Handbook
ALA's Past Presidents

Presidents of the American Library Association